Love Wins Out (Swedish: Kärleken segrar) is a 1949 Swedish drama film directed by Gustaf Molander and starring Karl-Arne Holmsten, Ingrid Thulin and Ilselil Larsen. It was shot at the Råsunda Studios in Stockholm with location shooting taking place around the city at Djursholm and Bromma Airport. The film's sets were designed by the art director Nils Svenwall.

Cast
 Karl-Arne Holmsten as 	Bertil Burman
 Ingrid Thulin as 	Margit Dahlman
 Ilselil Larsen as 	Leni Rosner
 Olof Winnerstrand as Albin Dahlman
 Ester Roeck Hansen as 	Mrs. Dahlman
 Hans Järrsten as 	Åke Dahlman 
 Sigge Fürst as 	Erik Berg
 Claus Wiese as Jörgen Solstad
 Anna-Lisa Baude as 	Greta
 Kolbjörn Knudsen as 	Hartman
 Sif Ruud as 	Mrs. Holm
 Birgitta Valberg as 	Schwester Erika
 Else-Merete Heiberg as	Karen Berg
 Solveig Hedengran as Barbro's mother 
 Mona Malm as 	Barbro, girl next door 
 John Ekman as 	Guest at the party
 Sven Holmberg as Guest at the party 
 Åke Engfeldt as 	Friend of Margit
 Maud Hyttenberg as 	German nurse 
 Svea Holm as 	Prison guard in Ravensbrück 
 Torsten Lilliecrona as 	Prison guard in Ravensbrück 
 Nils Ohlin as	Host of the party 
 Gösta Prüzelius as 	Red Cross-worker

References

Bibliography 
 Qvist, Per Olov & von Bagh, Peter. Guide to the Cinema of Sweden and Finland. Greenwood Publishing Group, 2000.

External links 
 

1949 films
Swedish drama films
1949 drama films
1940s Swedish-language films
Films directed by Gustaf Molander
Swedish black-and-white films
1940s Swedish films